This is intended to be a complete list of the Pennsylvania state historical markers in Philadelphia County, as placed by the Pennsylvania Historical and Museum Commission (PHMC).

As of 2021, there were 321 combined Roadside (larger) and City (narrower) markers affixed on posts and Plaque markers affixed to buildings or structures in Philadelphia County, Pennsylvania, which is coterminous with the city of Philadelphia. Of these, 12 are listed as Missing. Latitude and longitude coordinates are given as provided by the PHMC's database.

Historical markers

See also

List of Pennsylvania state historical markers
National Register of Historic Places listings in Philadelphia, Pennsylvania
List of National Historic Landmarks in Philadelphia

References

External links

Pennsylvania Historical Marker Program
Pennsylvania Historical & Museum Commission
ExplorePAhistory.com, a collaborative effort of the PHMC and WITF

Pennsylvania state historical markers in Philadelphia
Pennsylvania state historical markers in Philadelphia
Philadelphia County
Historic markers